1920: The Evil Returns is a 2012 Indian horror film written by Vikram Bhatt and directed by Bhushan Patel. The film is a quasi-sequel to a 2008 film 1920, second of the 1920 (film series), and stars Aftab Shivdasani, Tia Bajpai, Vidya Malvade and Sharad Kelkar in the lead roles. The movie is third in a series of quasi-sequels released under the Bhatt Banner including Raaz – The Mystery Continues, Murder 2, Jism 2, Jannat 2 and Raaz 3D each of which had nothing to do with their respective prequels, but somehow fell in the same genre following a similar story. The trailer was released on 28 September 2012. The film released on 2 November 2012 to mixed reception and fared better at the opening Box Office weekend (122.7 million Net.) as compared to any other releases that week except Skyfall (270 million Net.).  U Dinesh Kumar, Professor at IIM Bangalore and his team worked with Ami Shah of IntelliAssist, the company that carried out the social media marketing for the film, and assessed Internet activities and campaigns with the case study later published by Harvard Business Publishing.

Plot 

In 1920, Jaidev Verma is a famous poet who lives the life of a loner as he is unable to meet the love of his life, Smriti. They got to know each other through an exchange of letters and slowly fall in love. One day, Jaidev receives a letter informing him that Smriti had died by an accident. Now his sister Karuna is the only support system that keeps him motivated. One day Jaidev finds an unconscious girl near a lake and brings her home. After gaining consciousness, she is unable to remember anything from her past life except Jaidev's poems. Karuna becomes skeptical of her presence in the house and gets even more so when the keeper of the cemetery warns them of an evil spirit inside her.

Jaidev is insistent on keeping her at home since he feels a connection with her. He names her Sangeeta. Sangeeta feels frightening phenomena, vomiting iron nails and seeing ghosts in her room. On their way to see a doctor, Sangeeta gets completely possessed by the ghost. To save her, the only person Jaidev can turn to is the cemetery keeper. Slowly Jaidev gets to know that Sangeeta is actually his lost love Smriti. He goes to Smriti's old address to find out the truth. He discovers that Karuna had come there before, asking about Smriti. Jaidev returns home and finds Karuna's body hanging in the forest with suicide notes around it. From Karuna's letters, he learns that his best friend Amar, who envied Jaidev's success, exploited Karuna to obtain revenge on him. When Amar discovered that Jaidev loved Smriti, he went to Smriti, posing as Jaidev, and took her to his residence in Shimla to exploit her, but in the process, Amar was killed. It is his spirit that is now possessing Smriti.

The cemetery keeper warns Jaidev that the spirit is very vengeful and has to be deceitfully taken to the same place it all happened — Amar's residence in Shimla. Once Smriti touches Amar's corpse, Amar's spirit will have to leave Smriti's body and return to his own body; the corpse can be set on fire then, releasing Amar's spirit from the karmic cycle of life and death. Whilst doing this, Smriti must not know where she is being taken, else the spirit will also know. So Smriti is made unconscious and completely enveloped in a sacred cloth. They reach the designated place, but the cemetery keeper trips and the sacred cloth moves away from Smriti's face, awakening the spirit. The possessed Smriti kills all but Jaidev.

Jaidev is badly injured in the battle against the spirit. The spirit in Smriti's body burns Amar's corpse, thus forever remaining in her body. Jaidev helplessly pleads with the spirit to kill him, since there is no meaning in letting him live if the spirit will take Smriti from him. Amar's spirit refuses, saying that this is exactly what he wanted: for Jaidev to suffer. Jaidev cuts a rope attached to a loft in ceiling; a corpse falls from there, landing on Smriti, and making contact with her touch. It is revealed in a flashback that Jaidev and the group had hidden the real corpse of Amar in the ceiling as precaution. The corpse comes alive as Amar is forced to return to his original body. Enraged, Amar's corpse tries to kill Smriti, but Jaidev saves her and sets Amar's corpse on fire, thus releasing Amar's spirit from the karmic cycle of life and death. In the end, Jaidev marries Smriti and they live happily with each other.

Cast 

 Aftab Shivdasani as Jaidev Verma
 Tia Bajpai as Smriti/Sangeeta
 Vidya Malvade as Karuna Verma
 Sharad Kelkar as Amar / Amar [ Evil Spirit Ghost ]  
 Vicky Ahuja as Bankimlal
 Sanjay Sharma as Bhola
 Tarakesh Chauhan as the doctor in the town hospital
 Naresh Sharma as the driver of a horse carriage
 Yogesh Tripathi as Chand
 Falguni Rajani as the landlord of Smriti's house

Soundtrack 

The music for the film was composed by Chirantan Bhatt and the lyrics written by Shakeel Azmi, Junaid Wasi & Manoj Yadav. The music got positive reviews from critics.

Hindi

Tamil

Critical reception

Renuka Vyavahare of Times of India gave it 3 stars. "1920 gives you the creeps...watch it." said ToI. Rediff Movies said "1920 Evil Returns is yet another needless horror film. It's cold and bland." and gave it 1 star. Roshni Devi of Koimoi gave it 2 stars. "Watch it only if you're desperate for some uninspiring horror. Give it a rest otherwise." wrote Roshni Devi. Social Movie Rating site MOZVO gave it a rating of 2.3 putting it in 'Below Average' category. Taran Adarsh of Bollywood Hungama gave it 2.5 stars.

Box office
1920 – Evil Returns had a decent opening weekend where it collected around  nett. The film had a good first week and collected  nett. It had collected around  nett in its second week taking its total to  nett.

Sequel

The reasonable success of 1920 – Evil Returns prompted producer Vikram Bhatt to plan another sequel. "I will be making another sequel to 1920. We are working on the script right now. It is too early to talk about it as we are developing the concept for it", Vikram said in an interview. It was also revealed that the film would not be in 3D. The sequel to the movie was later named as 1920 London, and released on 6 May 2016.

References

External links 
 
 

Hindi-language horror films
2012 films
2012 horror films
Films directed by Bhushan Patel
Films set in 1920
Films set in country houses
Films shot in Sweden
Indian horror films
2010s Hindi-language films